Dave Siebels With: Gordon Goodwin's Big Phat Band is a jazz album, the sixth of Gordon Goodwin's Big Phat Band. The group teamed up with Dave Siebels, a veteran organist, using many of Siebel's original compositions. The album includes funk, bebop, and modern big band-style songs and was released on December 1, 2008.

Track listing
"The Coupe"
"Not That There's Anything Wrong With That"
"Da Blues"
"Girl Talk"
"I Wish"
"The Gospel According to Hammond"
"I Love You Even More Again"
"The Cat"
"Sort of Like a Samba"
"The Eleventh Hour"

Featured soloists
 Gordon Goodwin – tenor saxophone
 Eric Marienthal – alto saxophone
 Wayne Bergeron – trumpet
 Andy Martin – trombone
 Grant Geissman – guitar
 Brian Scanlon – tenor saxophone   
 Sal Lozano – flute
 Dave Siebels – keyboards

References

Gordon Goodwin's Big Phat Band albums
2008 albums